Sunita Sarawagi is an Indian computer scientist known for her research in databases, data mining, and machine learning, including the use of natural language processing to extract structured data from text. She is Institute Chair Professor of Computer Science and Engineering at IIT Bombay.

Education and career
Sarawagi earned a bachelor's degree in computer science from IIT Kharagpur in 1991. She went to the University of California, Berkeley for graduate study in computer science with database expert Michael Stonebraker, earning a master's degree in 1993 and completing her Ph.D. in 1996, with the master's thesis Efficient Organization of Large Multidimensional Arrays and doctoral dissertation Query Processing in Tertiary Memory Databases.

After working as a researcher for IBM Research at the Almaden Research Center in San Jose, California, she became an assistant professor at IIT Bombay in 1999. She was promoted to associate professor in 2003 and full professor in 2014. Since 2020 she has headed the Center for Machine Intelligence and Data Science.

Recognition
Sarawagi was the winner of the 2019 Infosys Prize in Engineering and Computer Science "for her research in databases, data mining, machine learning and natural language processing, and for important applications of these research techniques". In the same year, IIT Kharagpur gave her their Distinguished Alumni Award, and IIT Bombay gave her their Prof. H. H. Mathur Excellence Award in Applied Sciences.

She was named to the Indian National Academy of Engineering in 2013, and was elected as a 2021 ACM Fellow "for contributions to statistical machine learning for information analysis, extraction, and integration".

References

External links
Home page

Year of birth missing (living people)
Living people
Indian computer scientists
Indian women computer scientists
IIT Kharagpur alumni
Academic staff of IIT Bombay
Fellows of the Association for Computing Machinery